The Albert Ott House is a historic house in Olathe, Kansas, U.S.. It was built in 1894 for Albert Ott, the president of the Olathe State Bank, and his wife Helena Hyer, whose brother founded the Hyer Boot Company. It was designed in the Queen Anne architectural style. It has been listed on the National Register of Historic Places since April 1, 1998.

References

Houses on the National Register of Historic Places in Kansas
Queen Anne architecture in Kansas
Houses completed in 1894
Houses in Johnson County, Kansas
1894 establishments in Kansas